Fred Wilson may refer to:

 Fred Wilson (baseball) (1908–1948), American Negro league baseball player
 Fred Wilson (footballer) (1912–1953), played Australian football with Richmond in the VFL
 Fred Wilson (politician) (born 1941), Canadian politician
 Fred Wilson (artist) (born 1954), African-American conceptual artist
 Fred Wilson (financier) (born 1961), New York–based venture capitalist
 Fred Wilson (ice hockey) (1892–1971), Canadian ice hockey player
 Fred F. Willson (1877–1956), American architect
 Fred O. Wilson (1903–1983), American politician, Attorney General of Arizona

See also
 Frederic Wilson (1881–1932), English sportsman and journalist known sometimes as Fred Wilson
 Frederick Wilson (disambiguation)